Wanderers of the West is a 1941 American Western film directed by Robert F. Hill and written by Robert Emmett Tansey. The film stars Tom Keene, Sugar Dawn, Slim Andrews, Betty Miles, Tom Seidel and Stanley Price. The film was released on July 25, 1941, by Monogram Pictures.

Plot

Cast          
Tom Keene as Tom Mallory / The Arizona Kid
Sugar Dawn as Sugar Dean 
Slim Andrews as Slim
Betty Miles as Laura Lee
Tom Seidel as Waco Dean / Rusty Mack
Stanley Price as Jack Benson
Gene Alsace as Bronco
Tom London as Sheriff
James Sherridan as Jeff Haines
Fred Hoose as Bartender

References

External links
 

1941 films
1940s English-language films
American Western (genre) films
1941 Western (genre) films
Monogram Pictures films
Films directed by Robert F. Hill
American black-and-white films
1940s American films